Zubdat-un-Nissa Begum (2 September 1651 – 17 February 1707) was a Mughal princess, the third daughter of Emperor Aurangzeb and his wife Dilras Banu Begum.

Life 
Zubdat-un-Nissa Begum was born on 2 September 1651 in Multan. Her father was Aurangzeb, who was then a prince, and her mother was Dilras Banu Begum. A well-read woman, Zubdat-un-Nissa had in-depth knowledge of the doctrines of Islam. 

Zubdat-un-Nissa married her first cousin, Prince Sipihr Shikoh on 30 January 1673, he was the third son of her paternal uncle, Crown Prince Dara Shikoh and her aunt Nadira Banu Begum. She was given a marriage portion of 400,000 rupees. A certain Hamida Banu Begam arranged the marriage feast. In 1676, Zubdat gave birth to a son, Shahzada Ali Tabar, who died within six months of his birth.

She died on 17 February 1707, less than a month before her father.

Ancestry

References

Mughal princesses
1651 births
1707 deaths
Mughal nobility
Timurid dynasty
People from Multan
Indian female royalty
17th-century Indian women
17th-century Indian people
18th-century Indian women
18th-century Indian people
Daughters of emperors